Aleksandar Nikolić (born 12 May 1919, date of death unknown) was a Yugoslav fencer. He competed in the team foil event at the 1936 Summer Olympics.

References

External links
 

1919 births
Year of death missing
Yugoslav male foil fencers
Olympic fencers of Yugoslavia
Fencers at the 1936 Summer Olympics
Sportspeople from Zrenjanin